San Javier is a city in the northeast of the , 156 km north-northeast from the provincial capital.

The town was founded in 1743 by Francisco de Echagüe y Andía, but only recognized as such by the provincial government in 1866. It attained the status of comuna (commune) on 1884-05-25, and became a city on 1979-12-02.

References
 
 

Populated places in Santa Fe Province
Populated places established in 1743
1743 establishments in the Spanish Empire